Slote is a surname. Notable people with the surname include:

Alfred Slote (born 1926), American author
Bernice Slote (1913–1983), American professor
Michael Slote, American professor and author

See also
Hower-Slote House
Slate (surname)
Slota